Sergiev-Kazan Church is a Russian Orthodox church in Krasnoobsk of Novosibirsk Oblast, Russia.

History
The church was constructed from 1996 to 2012. It was consecrated in 2012.

Gallery

References

Churches in Siberia
Russian Orthodox Church in Russia
Churches in Novosibirsk Oblast
Churches completed in 2012
Krasnoobsk